The Nodame Cantabile manga was written and illustrated by Tomoko Ninomiya. It was serialized by Kodansha in the biweekly josei (aimed at younger adult women) manga magazine Kiss from 10 July 2001 to 10 October 2009. The untitled chapters have been collected in 23 tankōbon volumes. It is licensed in North America by Del Rey Manga, in France by Pika Édition, in South Korea by Daiwon C.I., in Thailand by NED Comics, in Indonesia by Elex Media Komputindo, and in Taiwan by Tong Li Comics. All volume covers feature Nodame with a musical instrument.

Starting in May 2008, Japanese serialization changed from biweekly to monthly because of Ninomiya's pregnancy. Serialization went on hiatus starting October 2008 following the birth of her son and Ninomiya's subsequent diagnosis of having carpal tunnel syndrome, but resumed again with the 10 March 2009 issue of Kiss on an irregular schedule depending on her continued recovery. In June 2009, the series went on hiatus again when Ninomiya was hospitalized with acute appendicitis, and resumed serialization in the 25 July issue. In July 2009, Asahi Shimbun reported that the manga was scheduled to end in the spring of 2010, coinciding with the release of the final live-action movie. However, the series ended with chapter 136 in the 10 October 2009 issue of the magazine.

Starting in late 2009, a sequel titled Nodame Cantabile - Opera Hen started running in the same magazine. It ended in September 2010. The numbering of the volumes follow right after the original series so they start at volume 24.


Volume list

The short sequel series Nodame Cantabile - Opera Hen was published in two volumes. The numbering of the volumes follow the original series and so, begins at volume 24.

Notes

References

Nodame Cantabile
Nodame Cantabile